John Thomas Cottam (5 September 1867 in Sydney, New South Wales – 30 January 1897 in Western Australia) was an Australian cricketer who played in one Test in 1887.

Jack Cottam had played in only one first-class match – for New South Wales against the touring English cricket team, when he scored 29 and 14 not out – before making his Test debut a few days later in the Second Test against England at the Sydney Cricket Ground. Cottam made just four runs as Australia lost by 71 runs. Cottam's five other first-class matches came on New South Wales' tour of New Zealand in 1889–90, when he made three fifties including his highest score of 62, the only fifty in the match, when New South Wales beat Wellington.

Cottam went to the goldfields at Coolgardie, Western Australia, near Kalgoorlie, where he died of typhoid fever, aged 29, in 1897.

See also
 List of New South Wales representative cricketers

References

External links
 

Australia Test cricketers
New South Wales cricketers
Deaths from typhoid fever
1867 births
1897 deaths
Infectious disease deaths in Western Australia
Australian cricketers
Cricketers from Sydney